Paduka Sri Sultan ‘Abdu’l Jalil V Mu’azzam Shah Zilu’llah fil’Alam Khalifat ul-Muminin ibni al-Marhum Sultan Sulaiman Badr ul-‘Alam Shah (11 March 1738–29 January 1761) was the 14th Sultan and Yang di-Pertuan Besar of Johor and Pahang and their dependencies who reigned from 1760 to 1761.

Styled as Raja di-Baroh before his accession, he is the second son of the 12th Sultan of Johor, Sulaiman Badrul Alam Shah. Installed as Heir Apparent with the title of 'Raja Muda' in October 1759. He succeeded on the death of his father on August 20, 1760. His reign ended less than a year when he died of poisoning, possibly by a Bugis chief, at Kuala Selangor on January 29, 1761. He was buried at Batangan, Riau, having had issue, two sons.

References

Bibliography
 

Sultans of Johor
1738 births
1761 deaths
18th-century monarchs in Asia
House of Bendahara of Johor